Mirza Shahi ( – 29 September 2020) was a Pakistani actor and comedian popularly known with his role name Chacha Kamal. He played role of Batuta/Chacha Kamal in the popular television serial Nadaniyan.

Biography
Shahi started his film career from 1965 in film Shaadi in East Pakistani Film Industry. In 1967, he starred in the actor Nadeem's first film Chakori. He settled in Karachi with his family after the creation of Bangladesh. He also took extra jobs due to difficult family finances after emigrating from East Pakistan in 1971.

Some of his popular works include films Chakori, Quddusi Sahab Ki Bewah, and Chhotey Sahab.and Geo Tv comedy drama serial nadaniyaan where he play a role of chacha kamal 

In September 2020, he was diagnosed with COVID-19 during the COVID-19 pandemic in Pakistan. He died on 29 September 2020, at  Civil Hospital Karachi.

References

1950s births
2020 deaths
20th-century Pakistani male actors
Pakistani male comedians
Deaths from the COVID-19 pandemic in Sindh
Shahi